Clive Edwin Alexander Cheesman (born 1968) is a British officer of arms at the College of Arms in London. He is currently Richmond Herald, having been appointed to that position on 7 April 2010. Cheesman was formerly a curator in the Department of Coins and Medals in the British Museum. He served as Rouge Dragon Pursuivant-of-Arms in Ordinary from 17 November 1998 to 7 April 2010.

Background
Son of architect Wilfrid Henry Cheesman and his wife Elizabeth Amelia (née Hughes), a biochemist, Cheesman has a degree in Literae Humaniores (Classics or 'Greats') from Oxford University, where he was at Oriel. In 1993, he was awarded the degree of PhD from the Scuola Superiore di Studi Storici di San Marino, with a doctoral thesis on Roman history.

He is co-editor of The Heraldry Society's journal, The Coat of Arms, and from 2008 to 2013 was Chairman of The Friends of The National Archives. He received a Diploma in Law in 1995 from City University, London, and was called to the Bar of England and Wales as a member of Middle Temple in October 1996.

Cheesman's coat of arms was granted by the College of Arms shortly after his appointment as Rouge Dragon. On 31 December 1999, arms were granted with the blazon Per pale and per pall Argent and Sable. These were granted along with a crest blazoned A Crow Sable gorged with an ancient British Torque Or alighting on a man's Skull resting on its side Argent.

Cheesman became Richmond Herald of Arms in Ordinary in 2010, vacating the position of Rouge Dragon Pursuivant of Arms in Ordinary, which remained vacant until Adam Tuck took the position in 2019.

Publications
Cheesman, Clive, and Williams, Jonathan, Rebels, Pretenders and Impostors (London: British Museum Press, 2000), .
Cheesman, Clive (ed.), The Armorial of Haiti. Symbols of Nobility in the Reign of Henry Christophe. With a historical introduction by Marie-Lucie Vendryes and a preface by Her Excellency Michaëlle Jean, Governor-General of Canada (London: College of Arms, 2007), .

Arms

See also
Heraldry
Pursuivant

References

External links
The College of Arms
CUHAGS Officer of Arms Index

|-

1968 births
Living people
English curators
English genealogists
English officers of arms
Alumni of Oriel College, Oxford
Alumni of City, University of London